Vonoprazan/amoxicillin/clarithromycin, sold under the brand name Vonosap among others, is a co-packaged medication used for the treatment of Helicobacter pylori (H. pylori) infection. It contains vonoprazan (as the fumarate), a potassium-competitive acid blocker; amoxicillin, a beta-lactam antibiotic; and clarithromycin, a macrolide antibiotic.

It was approved for medical use in Japan in 2016, and in the United States in May 2022. The US Food and Drug Administration (FDA) considers it to be a first-in-class medication.

References

Further reading

External links 
 
 
 

Combination drugs
Drugs acting on the gastrointestinal system and metabolism
Proton-pump inhibitors